The 1948 Army Cadets football team represented the United States Military Academy in the 1948 college football season.  Led by head coach Earl Blaik, the Cadets offense scored 294 points while the defense allowed 89 points. At season’s end, Army was ranked sixth in the nation.

Coaching staff
Head coach Earl Blaik implemented a two-platoon system, using specialists strictly for offense and defense. Offensive coach Sid Gillman left Army after the season to become the head coach at the University of Cincinnati.

Schedule

References

Army
Army Black Knights football seasons
Lambert-Meadowlands Trophy seasons
College football undefeated seasons
Army Cadets football